Sala Municipality is a municipality in Västmanland County in central Sweden. Its seat is located in the city of Sala.

The present municipality was created in 1971, when the City of Sala was amalgamated with the rural municipalities Möklinta and Tärna and a part of Västerfärnebo.

Localities
 Kila
 Kumla kyrkby
 Möklinta
 Norrbäck
 Ransta
 Sala (seat)
 Salbohed
 Sätra brunn
 Västerfärnebo

See also
Gussjön

References

External links

Sala Municipality website

 
Municipalities of Västmanland County